Cassella may refer to:
 Cassella Farbwerke Mainkur Aktiengesellschaft, a German chemicals company founded by Leopold Cassela
 Cassella, Ohio, an unincorporated community in Marion Township, Mercer County, United States
 Maggie Cassella, a former lawyer, stand-up comedian, writer and American-Canadian actress

See also
 Casella (disambiguation), similar spelling